Hilal Pakistan is a Sindhi daily newspaper in Pakistan. It was founded in Hyderabad, Sindh.

History
The Daily Hilal is a newspaper published in Karachi, Pakistan. It is published in the Sindhi language, which is the third most spoken tongue in Pakistan, and the official language of the province of Sindh, home to the city and the paper. The Daily Hilal started publishing in 1946, making it the oldest running newspaper of Pakistan.

The newspaper is one of 11 dailies published in the Sindhi language in Karachi. It is a member of the APNS, the Associated Press News Service, which is a source of news, feature, interview and columnist material. Pakistan has a free press; however, there is significant pressure on reporters and editors from political and religious factions toward self-censorship.

See also
 Daily Kawish
 Daily Awami Awaz
 List of newspapers in Pakistan

References

External links
 Official website

Sindhi-language newspapers
Mass media in Karachi
Daily newspapers published in Pakistan